This is a list of notable Native Hawaiians. To be included on this list, they must be notable and be of the indigenous Polynesian people of the Hawaiian Islands, or their descendants.

Academia and science

Arts and entertainment

Business 
 William Heath Davis (1822 – 1909), merchant and trader; early pioneer of the city of San Diego, California

Literature

Media and journalism 
 Jeff Chang, journalist, author and music critic; of Hawaiian-Chinese ancestry

Music

Politics, military, and civil service

Sports

Surfers

Royalty and nobles

Others

See also 
 List of Hawaii suffragists

References

Hawaiians
Native Hawaiians
Native